A Bank van Lening is a Dutch term for an early type of bank that functioned similarly to a Mount of Piety (Dutch: Berg van Barmhartigheid). It was usually called the "lommerd".

Examples were:
Stadsbank van Lening, Amsterdam
Bank van Lening, Haarlem
Stadsleenbank Delft

Banking in the Netherlands
History of banking
Medieval banking
Pawn shops